Model 1885 (M1885) may refer to:

 3.2-inch gun M1885, a rifled breech-loading fieldgun
 M1885 Remington–Lee, a bolt-action box-magazine repeating rifle longgun
 Mannlicher M1885, a prototype predecessor to the bolt-action rifle longgun Mannlicher M1886
 Springfield Model 1855, a rifled musket
 Winchester Model 1885, a single-shot rifle longgun

See also

 
 
 
 M85 (disambiguation)